West End High School can refer to:

West End High School (Birmingham, Alabama) United States
West End High School (Walnut Grove, Alabama) United States
West End High School (Nashville, Tennessee) United States
West End High School (Dhaka, Bangladesh)
West End High School, Jhargram